Giulietta Simionato (born Giulia Simionato; Forlì, Romagna, 12 May 1910 – Rome, 5 May 2010) was an Italian mezzo-soprano. Her career spanned the period from the 1930s until her retirement in 1966.

Life
As a  girl she studied in a boarding school with nuns who sensed her musical qualities and invited her to study singing, which she did against the opposition of the family, especially her mother.  After the latter's death, Giulietta studied first in Rovigo, then in Padua. Her singing debut was in the 1927 musical comedy film, 'Nina, Don't Be Stupid'. The following year she made her operatic debut at Montagnana. In 1933 she won the first "bel canto competition" in Florence against 385 competitors and got an audition at the Teatro alla Scala. The result was positive, but the artistic director Fabbroni found her voice still immature and invited her to return a few years later. Two years later she was put under contract. In 1928, she sang in Verdi's Rigoletto. The first fifteen years of her career were frustrating, it seems because she was not supported by the fascist regime. She was only given minor roles and her career struggled to take off, but by the late 1940s she had attracted growing attention. In 1936, she made her debut at La Scala and appeared there regularly between 1936 and 1966. By then, Simionato was recognised as one of the most respected singers of her generation.  She had made her debut at the Royal Opera House, Covent Garden in 1953, where she likewise appeared regularly between 1963 and 1965.

Simionato made her United States opera debut in 1953 as Charlotte in Jules Massenet's Werther at the San Francisco Opera with Cesare Valletti in the title role. In 1959 she made her debut at the Metropolitan Opera, as Azucena in Il Trovatore, with Carlo Bergonzi, Antonietta Stella, and Leonard Warren. Simionato also appeared at the Edinburgh Festival (1947), the San Francisco Opera (1953), the Teatro Nacional de São Carlos (1954), the Lyric Opera of Chicago (1954–1961), the Vienna State Opera (from 1956), and the Salzburg Festival.   
In 1957, she sang in Anna Bolena with Maria Callas. In 1961, she withdrew from three performances at the Metropolitan Opera, with Trigeminal Neuralgia.

Simionato had a large repertory including Rossini's Rosina and Cinderella, Charlotte in Werther, and Carmen. She also excelled in the Verdian repertoire, as Amneris, Eboli and Azucena, and as Santuzza in Mascagni's Cavalleria rusticana.

She was a major recording artist, and in addition many of her performances gained live radio broadcast or were captured on film. Fono has gathered her recordings on the CD, The Color of a Voice. She retired in 1966, and married Dr. Cesare Frugoni.

She continued to inspire admiration through teaching and various directorial positions, with amazing vitality even in her 90s. She was featured in Daniel Schmid's award-winning 1984 documentary film Il Bacio di Tosca (Tosca's Kiss) about a home for retired opera singers founded by Giuseppe Verdi. She also appeared in an interview by Stefan Zucker in Jan Schmidt-Garre's 1999 film, Opera Fanatic.

She died in Rome one week before her 100th birthday.

Selected recordings
Selected recordings:

References

Further reading
 H. Rosenthal and J. Warrack, The Concise Oxford Dictionary of Opera, 2nd Edition, Oxford University Press, 1979, p. 462

External links

 Great Singers Giulietta Simionato Tribute
 "Giulietta Simionato", Bel Canto Society
 Giulietta Simionato on YouTube!
 Giulietta Simionato rules!
 Brief Interview with Giulietta Simionato by Bruce Duffie, 23 August 1987

1910 births
2010 deaths
Italian operatic mezzo-sopranos
People from Forlì
20th-century Italian women opera singers
Decca Records artists